Alessandro Antichi (born 14 May 1958 in Grosseto) is an Italian politician and lawyer.

Biography
Graduated at the University of Siena in 1982, he opened his own law firm in the city of Grosseto in 1985. He joined the centre-right party Forza Italia in 1995 and was elected Mayor of Grosseto on 28 April 1997. Antichi was the first centre-right politician to be elected mayor of the city.

He was re-elected for a second term on 14 May 2001. Antichi resigned three years later in order to run for the office of President of Tuscany at the 2005 Tuscan regional election, but he was ultimately defeated by the centre-left candidate Claudio Martini.

He served as member of the Regional Council of Tuscany from 2005 to 2009.

He ran for the office of President of the Province of Grosseto at the 2009 elections, but lost to Leonardo Marras.

See also
2005 Italian regional elections
List of mayors of Grosseto

References

Bibliography

External links

1958 births
Living people
Mayors of Grosseto
Forza Italia politicians
The People of Freedom politicians
Politicians from Grosseto